Hypera meles, the clover head weevil, is a species of true weevil in the beetle family Curculionidae. It is found in North America and Europe.

References

Further reading

External links

 

Hyperinae
Articles created by Qbugbot
Beetles described in 1792